Isla Santa Inés is an island in the Gulf of California east of the Baja California Peninsula. The island is uninhabited and is part of the Mulegé Municipality in the Mexican state of Baja California Sur.

Biology
Isla Santa Inés has two species of reptiles: Callisaurus draconoides (zebra-tailed lizard) and Coleonyx variegatus (western banded gecko).

References

Further reading

Islands of Baja California Sur
Islands of the Gulf of California
Uninhabited islands of Mexico